Below is a list of chess periodicals. Publications are included only if they accept contributions from multiple authors and their content focuses primarily on some aspect of chess.

See also
Canadian chess periodicals
Chess library
Chess columns in newspapers
List of chess books

References
The place, dates and frequency of publication are generally taken from the websites given in the table or from other Wikipedia articles. In a few cases, it was necessary to consult the catalog of the Cleveland Public Library.
Shakhmatny Bulletin - Chesscafe article

Further reading
 Chess Periodicals: An Annotated International Bibliography, 1836-2008, by Gino Di Felice, McFarland, 2010, .

External links
Chess periodicals
News in chess

 
Periodicals